Calista Corporation (pronounced ) is one of thirteen Alaska Native Regional Corporations created under the Alaska Native Claims Settlement Act of 1971 (ANCSA) in settlement of aboriginal land claims. Calista was incorporated in Alaska on June 12, 1972. Although the Calista region is in western Alaska, Calista Corporation is headquartered in Anchorage, Alaska. Calista is a for-profit corporation with 34,500 Alaska Native shareholders primarily of Yup'ik descent.

The name Calista (worker) is a portmanteau of the Central Alaskan Yup'ik words cali-, meaning "to work," and -ista, meaning someone or something which does. The Yup'ik language does not have a word for "corporation".

The Calista region covers Alaska's Bethel and Kusilvak census areas and includes 56 villages.

Shareholders
Currently, Calista has over 34,500 shareholders, almost all of whom are Central Alaskan Yup'ik people, Cup'ik or Athabaskan, and most of whom still speak the Yup'ik and Cupꞌik languages and live a largely subsistence lifestyle of hunting, fishing, and gathering. At incorporation, Calista Corporation enrolled 13,303 Alaska Natives, each of whom received 100 shares of Calista stock. The total number of shareholders continues to grow due to open enrollment for descendants of original shareholders.

As an ANCSA corporation, Calista Corporation has no publicly traded stock and its shares cannot legally be sold. In 2017, after a historic vote by our Shareholders, Calista Corporation joined a small but growing number of ANCSA corporations that have opened enrollment to the descendants of its original Shareholders.

Lands
Calista Corporation owns about 6.5 million acres (26,00 km2) in southwestern Alaska on the Yukon-Kuskokwim Delta and the Kuskokwim Mountains. Most of this land is split estate where the village corporation owns the surface estate and Calista owns the subsurface. The region's 56 villages selected the bulk of these lands near their villages based primarily on subsistence needs. Calista's entitlement also includes 264,000 acres of fee estate lands where Calista owns both surface and subsurface rights. Much of the fee estate entitlement is prospective for precious metal mineral resources.

Because of to the importance of the land to the traditional subsistence economies of the region's Yup'ik, Cup'ik, and Athabaskan residents, including the bulk of Calista's shareholders, Calista concentrated most of its land selections under ANCSA in areas surrounding the region's 56 villages.

In a land exchange with the federal government, finalized in 2001, some of Calista's surface land parcels and a portion of its subsurface estate were incorporated into the Yukon Delta National Wildlife Refuge, while preserving subsistence hunting and fishing rights.

Calista is land owner to subsurface rights from ANCSA, and holds title to the large Donlin Creek gold deposit, which is leased to Barrick Gold and NovaGold Resources.

Business enterprises
Key Calista businesses include oil well services, telecommunication and VoIP services, secure data hosting, cybersecurity, business services, equipment leasing, computer consulting, real estate, environmental consulting, construction, marketing and advertising.

Under federal law, Calista Corporation and some its majority-owned subsidiaries, joint ventures and partnerships are deemed to be "minority and economically disadvantaged business enterprise[s]" (43 USC 1626(e)).

Wholly owned subsidiaries
Calista Corporation's 30-plus subsidiaries involved in federal contracting, construction, engineering, oilfield services, equipment, real estate, and other services are organized in four holding lines:

Bektuq Holding, LLC
 Nordic-Calista, LLC
 E3 Alaska, LLC
 Qangan Lands, LLC

Bilista Holding, LLC
 Brice Inc.
 Brice Civil Constructors Inc.
 Brice Builders, LLC
 Brice Environmental
 Brice Engineering, LLC
 Brice Equipment
 Brice Marine
 Brice Solutions, LLC
 Browns Hill Quarry
 STG, Inc.
 STG Pacific, LLC
 Yukon Equipment, LLC
 Tunista Construction, LLC

Ena Holding, LLC
 Aulukista, LLC
 Calista Real Estate, LLC
 Tunista, Inc.

Yulista Holding, LLC
 Yulista Aviation, Inc.
 Yulista Integrated Solutions, LLC
 Y-Tech Services, Inc.
 Yulista Tactical Services, LLC
 Yulista Support Services, LLC
 Tunista Services, LLC
 Tunista Logistics Solutions, LLC
 Chiulista Services, Inc.
 Troy7, inc.

Joint Ventures
Calista owns joint ventures in:

 Delta EMI, LLC (25% owner of Delta Constructors, LLC)
 Redstone Defense Systems (51% owned by Yulista Aviation)
 Defense Systems and Solutions (51% owned by Yulista Integrated Solutions)

References

External links
Calista Corporation. Retrieved on 2022-02-1.
Corporations Database. Division of Corporations, Business & Professional Licensing, Alaska Department of Commerce, Community and Economic Development. Retrieved on 2022-02-1.
 Calista Corporation (official website)

1972 establishments in Alaska
Alaska Native culture in Anchorage
Alaska Native regional corporations
Companies based in Anchorage, Alaska